Prophecy is a prediction or the disclosure of information that is not known to the prophet by any ordinary means.

Prophecy may also refer to:

Gaming 
 Prophecy (Magic: The Gathering), an expansion to the Magic: The Gathering collectible card game
 Tomb Raider: The Prophecy, a 2002 Tomb Raider game for the Game Boy Advance by Ubi Soft
 Wing Commander: Prophecy, the fourth direct sequel in Chris Roberts' Wing Commander science fiction flight simulator franchise
 Guild Wars Prophecies, the first game in the Guild Wars series
 Prophecy: The Fall of Trinadon, a 1989 game by Activision
 In the Yu-Gi-Oh! Trading Card Game, there's an archetype of monsters named "Prophecy".

Music 
 Prophecy (Soulfly album), 2004
 Prophecy (Capleton album), 1995
 Prophecy (Fred Hopkins and Diedre Murray album), 1998
 "Prophecy" (Mami Kawada song), 2009
 "Prophecy" (Remy Zero song), 1998
 "Prophecy" (Soulfly song), a song by Soulfly from the album Prophecy
 "Prophecy", a song by Front Line Assembly from Implode
 "Prophecy", a song by Iced Earth from Something Wicked
 "Prophecy", a song by Mike Oldfield from Music of the Spheres
 "Prophecy", a song by Judas Priest from Nostradamus
 "Prophecy", a song by Queensrÿche from Queensrÿche (EP)
 "Prophecy", a song by Zion I from Starship EP
 "A Prophecy", a song by Asking Alexandria from Stand Up and Scream
 Korg Prophecy, analogue modelling synthesiser made by Korg

Television episodes 
 "Prophecy" (Legend of the Seeker)
 "Prophecy" (Star Trek: Voyager)
 "Prophecy" (Stargate SG-1)

Other media 
 Prophecy (film), a 1979 ecological horror film starring Robert Foxworth and Talia Shire
 Prophecy (manga), a manga series by Tetsuya Tsutsui
 Prophecy (Harry Potter), a prediction made by Sybill Trelawney in the Harry Potter series by J. K. Rowling

See also
 The Prophecy (disambiguation)
 Prophet (disambiguation)
 Fortune teller
 Psychic
 Astrology
 The Chosen One (disambiguation)